Luísa Isabella Nolasco da Silva Leong Lok-yau (born 23 June 1988), better known as Isabella Leong, is a Macanese actress and former singer.

Early life
Luísa Isabella Nolasco da Silva was born on 23 June 1988, in Macao to Luís Alberto Marques Nolasco da Silva (b. Sé, 8 August 1951; d. São Lourenço, 20 January 1989) and a croupier. She has a sister who is seven years older.

Leong's father was a descendant of one of the most prominent and long-established Macanese families, . Her father was a Eurasian born to Frederico Joao Moreira de Sousa Teles de Menezes, a Portuguese father and Terry Marques Nolasco, a Chinese woman living in Portugal. Frederico Joao is the sixth generation of the family and former President of the Macau Football Association. Leong's father has two elder brothers, Henrique and Frederico and one younger brother, Jose Manuel.

Leong's father suffered from a secret drug addiction and died from an overdose when she was only 6 months old. Leong had never received recognition from her paternal family, so she took her mother's surname. Leong's mother worked as a croupier in Casino Lisboa and Leong was responsible for contributing to the family's finances.

In 1993, she moved from Macau to Hong Kong and enrolled in Po Leung Kuk Camões Tan Siu Lin Primary School, after which she went to several schools in Hong Kong and Macao. She attended Macau Sam Yuk Middle School in 1999 but dropped out.

Career 
To help provide for her family, Leong abandoned school at age 12 to become a model for Emperor Entertainment Group.

She later began singing and released her debut album, Isabella, when she was 16 years old. Isabella did not achieve the success hoped for and Leong subsequently debuted with acting. From 2005 to 2007, she made a string of films including The Eye 10, Bug Me Not!, Isabella, Diary, and Spider Lilies.

Leong won her first American film role in The Mummy: Tomb of the Dragon Emperor, which was released in 2008.

EEG contract dispute 
Emperor Entertainment Group filed a lawsuit in the High Court on 3 April 2008, to seek damages from Leong for breaking a 10-year contract which Leong's mother signed for her when she was only 12 years old. Leong filed a writ against the company on 27 April. In November 2008, the legal battle between Leong and EEG ended in an out-of-court settlement, with the star "free to pursue her career".

Personal life 
In 2008, Leong met Hong Kong businessman Richard Li, son of billionaire Li Ka-shing, on a movie set, when she was 20 and he was 41. In April 2009, Leong gave birth to their first son Ethan Li Cheung Tsz. For this, Leong was allowed to use Li's family mansions in San Francisco. They also provided her with an entourage of caregivers, including five bodyguards, four full-time nannies and a personal attendant.

In June 2010, Leong gave birth to Li's twin sons in San Francisco.

In March 2011, Leong announced that she and Li had ended their relationship. They both declared that the split was amicable and that they would both take care of their children.

Discography

Publication

Filmography

Awards 
Fantasporto (2006)
 Best Actress for Isabella
Golden Bauhinia Awards (2006)
 Best New Performer for Isabella

Nominations 
Hong Kong Film Awards (2005)
 Best New Performer for Bug Me Not
Hong Kong Film Awards (2007)
 Best Actress for Isabella
Hong Kong Film Awards (2007)
 Best Supporting Actress for Diary
Golden Bauhinia Awards (2007)
 Best Supporting Actress for Diary

References

External links
 
 EEG Isabella Leong Profile
 

1988 births
Nolasco da Silva family
Cantopop singers
21st-century Hong Kong women singers
Hong Kong film actresses
Hong Kong television actresses
Hong Kong people of British descent
Hong Kong people of Portuguese descent
Living people
Macau-born Hong Kong artists
Macanese film actresses